Anomodon is an extinct genus of talpid mole from Galena, Illinois. The type, and only species, A. snyderi, was named and described in 1848 by John Lawrence LeConte. The type specimen is ANSP 11631, a canine tooth, of which the genus is based on.

References 

Fossil taxa described in 1848
Pleistocene mammals
Talpidae